In mathematics, Sobolev spaces for planar domains are one of the principal techniques used in the theory of partial differential equations for solving the Dirichlet and Neumann boundary value problems for the Laplacian in a bounded domain in the plane with smooth boundary. The methods use the theory of bounded operators on Hilbert space. They can be used to deduce regularity properties of solutions and to solve the corresponding eigenvalue problems.

Sobolev spaces with boundary conditions
Let  be a bounded domain with smooth boundary.

 .
Let  be such that  in the Sobolev norm, and set .

By Green's theorem this implies

where

with  the unit normal to the boundary.

In fact this is proved by locally applying a small translation to move the domain inside itself and then smoothing by a smooth convolution operator.

Suppose  in  annihilates .

This extension  defines an element in  using the formula for the norm

Let  be the orthogonal projection onto , so that  is the orthogonal projection onto . When , this just gives .

Canonical isometries: The operator  gives an isometry of  into  and of  onto .

Since the adjoint map between the duals can by identified with this map, it follows that  is a unitary map.

Application to Dirichlet problem

Invertibility of  
In fact it is a Fredholm operator of index .

Eigenvalue problem 
Let  be the operator on  defined by

Sobolev spaces without boundary condition
To determine the regularity properties of the eigenfunctions  and solutions of

enlargements of the Sobolev spaces  have to be considered. The Sobolev space  is defined to the Hilbert space completion of this space for the norm

Invariance under diffeomorphism: Any diffeomorphism between the closures of two smooth domains induces an isomorphism between the Sobolev space. This is a simple consequence of the chain rule for derivatives.
The extension map  is defined to be the inverse of this map: it is an isomorphism (not necessarily norm preserving) of  onto the orthogonal complement of  such that . On , it agrees with the natural inclusion map. For smooth curves the Seeley extension theorem provides an extension which is continuous in all the Sobolev norms.

Assuming 0 is the left end point, an extension is given locally by

Matching the first derivatives of order k or less at 0, gives

This matrix equation is solvable because the determinant is non-zero by Vandermonde's formula.

This is an immediate consequence of the extension theorem and the support properties for Sobolev spaces with boundary condition.
Duality:  is naturally the dual of H−k0(Ω). Again this is an immediate consequence of the restriction theorem. Thus the Sobolev spaces form a chain:

The differentiation operators  carry each Sobolev space into the larger one with index 1 less.

Here the derivatives are taken within the chain of Sobolev spaces above.

 
Similarly the result can be proved directly for an annulus .

Both assertions are consequences of the formula:

These results on  imply analogous results on the annulus using the extension.

Regularity for Dirichlet problem

Regularity for dual Dirichlet problem 

The collar is diffeomorphic to an annulus. The rotational flow  on the annulus induces a flow  on the collar with corresponding vector field . Thus  corresponds to the vector field . The radial vector field on the annulus  is a commuting vector field which on the collar gives a vector field  proportional to the normal vector field. The vector fields  and  commute.

The difference quotients  can be formed for the flow .

It follows that  lies in  where  is the vector field

Let  be the orthogonal vector field

For then

Note that

are vector fields. But then

Moreover, the inequalities for  show that

Hence

Smoothness of eigenfunctions 

Solving the Dirichlet problem 
The dual Dirichlet problem can be used to solve the Dirichlet problem:

Then  solves the Dirichlet problem. By the maximal principle, the solution is unique.

Application to smooth Riemann mapping theorem
The solution to the Dirichlet problem can be used to prove a strong form of the Riemann mapping theorem for simply connected domains with smooth boundary. The method also applies to a region diffeomorphic to an annulus. For multiply connected regions with smooth boundary  have given a method for mapping the region onto a disc with circular holes. Their method involves solving the Dirichlet problem with a non-linear boundary condition. They construct a function  such that:

 gives a proof of the Riemann mapping theorem for a simply connected domain  with smooth boundary. Translating if necessary, it can be assumed that . As such it must satisfy the Cauchy–Riemann equations:

The solution is given by

Since  has winding number , so too does . On the other hand,  only for  where there is a simple zero. So by the argument principle  assumes every value in the unit disc, exactly once and  does not vanish inside . By the Cauchy-Riemann equations these tangential derivative are up to a sign the directional derivative in the direction of the normal to the boundary. But  vanishes on the boundary and is strictly negative in  since . So on the boundary curve,  has nowhere vanishing derivative. Since the boundary curve has winding number one,  defines a diffeomorphism of the boundary curve onto the unit circle. Accordingly,  is a smooth diffeomorphism, which restricts to a holomorphic map  and a smooth diffeomorphism between the boundaries.

By translating we can assume 1 lies on the outer boundary. On the other hand, on each boundary curve the contribution is the integral of the normal derivative along the boundary. So there is a constant  such that  satisfies

on each boundary curve. The harmonic conjugate  of  can again be defined by

The function

On the outer curve  and on the inner curve . The tangential derivatives on the outer curves are nowhere vanishing by the Cauchy-Riemann equations, since the normal derivatives are nowhere vanishing. The normalization of the integrals implies that  restricts to a diffeomorphism between the boundary curves and the two concentric circles. This  is a smooth diffeomorphism of  onto the closed annulus , restricting to a holomorphic map in the interior and a smooth diffeomorphism on both boundary curves.

Trace map
In fact 
 

so the Cauchy–Schwarz inequality yields

where, by the integral test,

In fact set

where

Thus . If g is smooth, then by construction Eg restricts to g on 1 × T. Moreover, E is a bounded linear map since

It follows that there is a trace map τ of Hk(Ω) onto Hk − ½(∂Ω). Indeed, take a tubular neighbourhood of the boundary and a smooth function ψ supported in the collar and equal to 1 near the boundary. Multiplication by ψ carries functions into Hk of the collar, which can be identified with Hk of an annulus for which there is a trace map. The invariance under diffeomorphisms (or coordinate change) of the half-integer Sobolev spaces on the circle follows from the fact that an equivalent norm on Hk + ½(T) is given by

It is also a consequence of the properties of τ and E (the "trace theorem"). In fact any diffeomorphism f of T induces a diffeomorphism F of T2 by acting only on the second factor. Invariance of Hk(T2) under the induced map F* therefore implies invariance of Hk − ½(T) under f*, since f* = τ ∘ F* ∘ E.

Further consequences of the trace theorem are the two exact sequences

 
and

where the last map takes f in H2(Ω) to f|∂Ω and ∂nf|∂Ω. There are generalizations of these sequences to Hk(Ω) involving higher powers of the normal derivative in the trace map:

The trace map to  takes f to

Abstract formulation of boundary value problems
The Sobolev space approach to the Neumann problem cannot be phrased quite as directly as that for the Dirichlet problem. Instead an alternative formulation of boundary value problems for the Laplacian  on a bounded region  in the plane is used. Integration over the boundary is not involved in defining the Dirichlet form. Instead, if the Dirichlet form satisfies a certain positivity condition, termed coerciveness, solution can be shown to exist in a weak sense, so-called "weak solutions". It is explained how the Dirichlet problem, as discussed above, fits into this framework. Then a detailed treatment of the Neumann problem from this point of view is given following .

The Hilbert space formulation of boundary value problems for the Laplacian  on a bounded region  in the plane proceeds from the following data:

 A closed subspace .
  is coercive, i.e. there is a positive constant  and a non-negative constant  such that .

for all g.

For both the Dirichlet and Neumann problem

For the Dirichlet problem . In this case

For the Neumann problem  is taken to be .

Application to Neumann problem
The classical Neumann problem on  consists in solving the boundary value problem

Green's theorem implies that for 

Hence the Neumann problem has a unique solution up to adding constants.

Consider the Hermitian form on  defined by

The map  is an isometry of  onto , so in particular  is bounded.

In fact

So

By the Riesz–Fischer theorem, there exists  such that

Hence  and so  is surjective.

The operator  has the following properties:

 is a contraction since it is a composition of contractions
 is self-adjoint, since if , they can be written  with  so

 has positive spectrum and kernel , for

and  implies  and hence .

Thus

The eigenvalue  occurs with multiplicity one and corresponds to the constant function. For if  satisfies , then

so  is constant.

Regularity for Neumann problem

Weak solutions are strong solutions
The first main regularity result shows that a weak solution expressed in terms of the operator  and the Dirichlet form  is a strong solution in the classical sense, expressed in terms of the Laplacian  and the Neumann boundary conditions.

Note that

since

The operator  is characterized by

Then

so that

Interior estimates 
If  and 

So

Hence . Moreover,

so that

Boundary estimates 
The function  is supported in a collar contained in a tubular neighbourhood of the boundary.

This is equivalent to checking the inequality

Hence the difference quotients  are uniformly bounded, and therefore  with

Hence  and  satisfies a similar inequality to :

Let  be the orthogonal vector field. As for the Dirichlet problem, to show that , it suffices to show that .

To check this, it is enough to show that . As before

are vector fields. Hence

Moreover, the inequalities for  show that

Hence

It follows that . Moreover,

Neumann boundary conditions 
Since , Green's theorem is applicable by continuity.

Hence the Neumann boundary conditions are satisfied:

Regularity of strong solutions

The Neumann boundary condition can be written

Smoothness of eigenfunctions 

Solving the associated Neumann problem 
The method above can be used to solve the associated Neumann boundary value problem:

By Borel's lemma  is the restriction of a function . Let  be a smooth function such that  near the boundary. Then  solves the boundary value problem.

Notes

References

  

 

Partial differential equations
Harmonic analysis
Operator theory
Functional analysis